What a Wonderful World is a 2014 Moldovan film directed and written by Anatol Durbală, set during the April 2009 Moldovan parliamentary election protests.

Plot
A 22-year-old Moldovan comes home from Boston, Massachusetts and finds himself in the midst of a major protest.

Reception

At the 2014 Warsaw Film Festival, Durbală won the FIPRESCI Prize. At the 2015 Independent Film Festival Boston it won Best Director, Best Foreign Film and Best Writing awards. Controversially, the film was not submitted for the Academy Award for Best Foreign Language Film, despite Moldova submitting films in the two previous years; this was presumed to be because the political content was embarrassing to the Moldovan government.

References

External links

Moldovan drama films
2014 films
Films directed by Anatol Durbală
2010s Romanian-language films
Films set in Moldova
2014 directorial debut films
Films set in 2009